Four is a commune in the Isère department in southeastern France.

Population

Twin towns
Four is twinned with:

  Pusiano, Italy, since 2013

See also
Communes of the Isère department

References

Communes of Isère
Isère communes articles needing translation from French Wikipedia